Major-General David McDowall CBE (born 16 August 1954) is a former British Army officer who commanded 2nd Division.

Military career
McDowall joined the British Army as a private in the Royal Corps of Signals at the age of 18. He was commissioned into the Corps in 1981 and later commanded a squadron in operations in Northern Ireland and a regiment in operations during the Bosnian War. He went on to be Commander 1st Signal Brigade and then Signal Officer-in-Chief before being appointed General Officer Commanding 2nd Division and Governor of Edinburgh Castle in 2007 and retiring in 2009.

He has served as a member of the Government's Panel on Fair Access to the Professions and military advisor to the First Minister of Scotland.

Family
He is married to Valerie; they have two sons and a daughter.

References

1954 births
Living people
British Army generals
Royal Corps of Signals officers
Commanders of the Order of the British Empire
NATO personnel in the Bosnian War
British military personnel of The Troubles (Northern Ireland)